Trap God 3 is the eleventh studio album by American rapper Gucci Mane. It serves as the third installment in his Trap God series. 
The album is the only one in the series to have been released during Gucci Mane's incarceration, on October 17, 2014, by 1017 Records and RBC Records. The mixtape features one lone guest appearance by Chicago rapper Chief Keef.

Track listing

References

2015 albums
Albums produced by Honorable C.N.O.T.E.
Gucci Mane albums
Sequel albums